The canton of Dax-1 is an administrative division of the Landes department, southwestern France. It was created at the French canton reorganisation which came into effect in March 2015. Its seat is in Dax.

It consists of the following communes:
 
Angoumé
Dax (partly)
Gourbera
Herm
Mées
Rivière-Saas-et-Gourby
Saint-Paul-lès-Dax
Saint-Vincent-de-Paul
Siest
Tercis-les-Bains
Téthieu

References

Cantons of Landes (department)